Barton station may refer to:

Railway stations
 Barton railway station, West Lancashire, England (1887–1938)
 Barton and Broughton railway station, Lancashire, England (1840–1939)
 Barton and Walton railway station, Staffordshire, England (1839–1958)
 Barton's Bridge station, a former name of Flemington Junction station, New Jersey, US (1875–1961)
 Barton Hill railway station, North Yorkshire, England (1845–1930)
 Barton le Street railway station, North Yorkshire, England (1853–1931)
 Barton Moss railway station, Lancashire (now Greater Manchester), England (1832–1929)
 Barton-on-Humber railway station, Lincolnshire, England (1849 – present)
 Barton Stacey railway station, Hampshire, England (1939–1940)
 Barton Street railway station, a former name of St Luke's railway station, Southport, Lancashire (now Merseyside), England (1883–1968)

Other
 Barton-upon-Humber Police Station, Lincolnshire, England (1847–2005)
 Barton Power Station, Lancashire (now Greater Manchester), England (1923–1974)
 Barton Station, unincorporated community also known as Barton, Alabama, US